Volkovsky (masculine), Volkovskaya (feminine), or Volkovskoye (neuter) may refer to:
Volkovsky (rural locality) (Volkovskaya, Volkovskoye), name of several rural localities in Russia
Volkovskaya (Saint Petersburg Metro), a metro station of the Saint Petersburg Metro, Russia
Volkovskoye Municipal Okrug, a municipal okrug of Frunzensky District of Saint Petersburg, Russia